Sundarimaarude Swapnangal is a 1978 Indian Malayalam-language film,  directed by K. Shankar. The film stars Prem Nazir, Sharada, Jayabharathi and Thikkurissy Sukumaran Nair. The film has musical score by M. S. Viswanathan.

Cast
Prem Nazir
Sharada
Jayabharathi
Thikkurissy Sukumaran Nair
Hema Choudhary

Bahadoor
Sattar

Shylaja

Soundtrack
The music was composed by M. S. Viswanathan and the lyrics were written by Chirayinkeezhu Ramakrishnan Nair.

References

External links
 

1978 films
1970s Malayalam-language films
Films scored by M. S. Viswanathan
Films directed by K. Shankar